"Water féerie" (Belarusian language: Водная феерыя, Vodnaya feyeryya) was a flashmob performance, initiated by several Belarusian youth opposition movements on May 14, 2005 on the 10th anniversary of the referendum (which abolished historical national symbols of Belarus: white-red-white flag and Pahonia coat of arms). 

The action was in the form of boat racing under white-red-white flags and the flag of Europe on Svislach river in Minsk in the vicinity of the Masherov Avenue.

Politics of Belarus
History of Minsk